Al-Wehda Sports & Cultural Club is a Yemeni football club based in Sana'a. Founded in 1954, Al-Wahda (which means "unity" in Arabic), is one of the most successful and famous clubs in Yemen, having won the Yemeni League four times since 1990.

Al-Wehda has a fierce rivalry with local rivals Al-Ahli Club Sana'a.

Honours
Yemeni League: 1 (before 1990)
1978/79
Yemeni League: 4 (since 1990) 
1994/95, 1996/97, 1997/98, 2001/02
Prince Nassem's Cup: 2

Performance in AFC competitions
 AFC Champions League: 4 appearances
2004, 2000, 1999, 1998

External links
 Team's profile - kooora.com

Sport in Sanaa
Football clubs in Yemen
Association football clubs established in 1954
1954 establishments in Asia
Establishments in the Kingdom of Yemen